The 47th Filmfare Awards South ceremony honouring the winners and nominees of the best of South Indian cinema in films released 1999, is an event that was held at the Jawaharlal Nehru Stadium, Chennai, 22 April 2000.The awards were distributed at Chennai.

Main awards

Kannada cinema

Malayalam cinema

Tamil cinema

Telugu cinema

Technical Awards

Special awards

References

External links
 
 

Filmfare Awards South